One by AOL, formerly known as Millennial Media, is an advertising company that places display ads on mobile devices (mobile marketing).

History 

One by AOL was founded as Millennial Media in May 2006 by Paul Palmieri and Chris Brandenburg. The company received $64.8M in funding between 2007 and 2011 from venture capitalists, and went on to acquire several companies, including TapMetrics in 2010, Condaptive in 2011, Jumptap in 2013, and Nexage in 2014.

In January 2012, Millennial Media filed with the SEC for an initial public offering of its common stock, and the company was first listed in March 2012.

On January 27, 2014, Palmieri stepped down from his position and was replaced by Michael Barrett.

On September 3, 2015, AOL agreed to buy Millennial Media for US$238 million. On October 23, 2015, AOL completed the acquisition, and changed the name to ONE by AOL.

References

American companies established in 2006
Marketing companies established in 2006
Online advertising services and affiliate networks
Companies based in Baltimore
Companies formerly listed on the New York Stock Exchange
2012 initial public offerings
2015 mergers and acquisitions
AOL